Boris Becker was the defending champion, but he retired from his quarterfinals match this year.

Stefan Edberg won the tournament, beating Ivan Lendl in the final, 6–7, 6–4, 6–4.

Seeds

Draw

Finals

Top half

Bottom half

References

 Main Draw

1987 Grand Prix (tennis)
Tokyo Indoor